Taganskaya is a Moscow Metro station in the Tagansky District, Central Administrative Okrug, Moscow. It is on the Tagansko–Krasnopresnenskaya line, between Kitay-gorod and Proletarskaya stations.

Taganskaya opened in 1966 as part of the start of the Zdanovsky (now Tagansky) radius. The station's decoration is sparse yet stylish for the 1960s functional designs. Because the deep pylon trivault offers more potential for decorations, architects Nina Alyoshina and Yury Vdovin exploited this. Decorating the white marbled pylons with brown marble stripes. Likewise the white and black ceramic tiles and are decorated with metallic artworks with a space theme. The floor is covered with red and grey granite. The underground vestibule of the station is interlinked with the subway under the Bolshaya Kammenka street. The surface staircases of which are protected from the weather with glazed concrete pavilions (the first in Moscow). When the station was opened it was the terminus of the Zhdanovskaya line until 1970. Behind the station is a junction link allowing the train to reverse, also it leads onto a service link branch to the Koltsevaya line.

From the start the station was designed as a transfer point with the western escalators leading on to the Taganskaya station of the Koltsevaya line. In 1979, with the construction of the Marksistskaya station of the Kalininskaya line, three staircases were built into the northern wall.

External links
Mymetro 
KartaMetro.info – Station location and exits on Moscow map (English/Russian)

Moscow Metro stations
Railway stations in Russia opened in 1966
Tagansko-Krasnopresnenskaya Line
Railway stations located underground in Russia